Shikishima may refer to:

People
 Shikishima Katsumori, a Japanese sumo wrestler

Places
 Shikishima, Yamanashi, in Japan
 Shikishima Station, in Gunma Prefecture, Japan

Transport
 Shikishima class (PLH), a class of patrol vessel operated by the Japan Coast Guard
 Shikishima (PLH 31), a patrol vessel of the Japan Coast Guard
 Shikishima-class battleship, a class of battleships built for the Imperial Japanese Navy in the late 1890s
 E001 series, a Japanese luxury cruise train set branded Train Suite Shiki-shima